Santo Domingo, alternatively known as Santo Domingo del Mérida, is a city in Venezuela, located in Mérida.  It is the municipal seat of Cardenal Quintero Municipality.

References

Cities in Mérida (state)